Brad Rumsey (born March 4, 1986) is an American football coach. He is the offensive coordinator at Olivet College in Olivet, Michigan.

References

External links
 Olivet profile

1986 births
Living people
Ave Maria Gyrenes football coaches
Hillsdale Chargers football players
Hillsdale Chargers football coaches
Olivet Comets football coaches
Trine Thunder football coaches
High school football coaches in Michigan
People from Concord, Michigan